Janine Chanteur (died 5 June 2015) was a French philosopher. She was a professor emeritus of moral and political philosophy at the Paris-Sorbonne University.

Biography 
Chanteur was made an associante professor of philosopher in 1978, when she was awarded her doctorate. She later became a professor of moral and political philosophy at the University of Paris-Sorbonne (Paris IV). In 1989, she was elected to the position of Secretary General of the International Institute of Political Philosophy. Between 1985 and 1997, she oversaw 29 theses.

She married the medical professor Jean Chanteur, with whom she has five children.

She was a member of the Academy of Education and the Social Studies (AES). She died on June 5, 2015.

Publications 
Chanteur has published numerous articles and books, including:
 Condamnés à mort ou condamnés à vivre? Autour de l'arrêt Perruche (Condemned to death or condemned to live? Perruche's Judgement), Factuel, 2002
Commentary of Patrick Verspieren in the journal Études
 Comment l'esprit vint à l'homme ou l'aventure de la liberté (How the spirit came to humans or the adventure of freedom), L'Harmattan, 2001 
 Du droit des bêtes à disposer d'elles-mêmes (The rights of Animals to self-determination), Seuil, 1999
 La paix, un défi contemporain (Peace, a contemporary challenge), L'Harmattan, 1995
 Les petits-enfants de Job : une enfance meurtrie (The grandchildren of Job: a wounded childhood), Seuil, 1990
 De la guerre à la paix (From War to Peace), PUF, 1989
Commentary of Marie-Lucy Dumas published in 1989 in the journal Politique étrangère, year 1989, volume 54, issue 4, pages 808-809
Daily CommentaryL'Humanité published on the 21 avril 2003
 Platon, le désir et la cité (Plato, the desire and the city), Sirey, collection "philosophie politique", 1980

Awards and honours 
She was honoured as a commander of the National order of Merit.

In 1990, Chanteur received the Prix Biguet from the Académie française; it is an annual award to recognise French literature, although it can be awarded for work in the fields of history, sociology and philosophy. She received it for her work  De la guerre à la paix (From war to peace).

In 1991, she was the prize laureate for believing writers for her work Les petits enfants de Job (The grandchildren of Job).

In 2002, Chanteur received the Gallet Prize from Académie des sciences morales et politiques for Condamnés à mort ou condamnés à vivre? Autour de l'arrêt Perruche (Condemned to death or condemned to live? Perruche's Judgement).

References

External links 
 Donner naissance à un enfant handicapé dans le quotidien La Croix, Janine Chanteur livre son témoignage : "Être parent d'un enfant handicapé mental, cela s'apprend".

2015 deaths
20th-century French philosophers
21st-century French philosophers
French women philosophers
Commanders of the Ordre national du Mérite
20th-century French women
21st-century French women